Kampong Sabun is a village in Brunei-Muara District, Brunei, near the port town Muara. The population was 412 in 2016. It is one of the villages within Mukim Serasa. The postcode is BT2128.

References 

Sabun